The Târnauca is a left tributary of the river Suceava. Its source is located near the village Bila Krynytsia in Ukraine. The river then crosses the border into Romania, joining the Suceava near the village of Costișa.

References

Rivers of Romania
Rivers of Chernivtsi Oblast
Rivers of Suceava County